Ram Probesh Mondal was an Indian teacher and politician belonging to All India Trinamool Congress. He was elected as a member of West Bengal Legislative Assembly from Manikchak in 1996. He died on 23 June 2018.

References

2018 deaths
Trinamool Congress politicians from West Bengal
West Bengal MLAs 1996–2001
People from Malda district
Year of birth missing